Ppoa or PPOA may refer to:

 Point-to-Point Protocol over ATM, a network protocol
 Linoleate 8R-lipoxygenase, an enzyme
 9,12-octadecadienoate 8-hydroperoxide 8R-isomerase, an enzyme